Hymenothrix is a small genus of North American flowering plants in the daisy family known as thimbleheads. They are native to the southwestern United States and northern Mexico.

These are spindly, erect annual, biennial, and perennial herbs with white or yellow flowers.

 Species
The following species are recognised in the genus Hymenothrix:
 Hymenothrix autumnalis - Coahuila, Nuevo León
 Hymenothrix biternata - United States (Arizona New Mexico)
 Hymenothrix dissecta - Baja California, Sonora, Chihuahua, Coahuila, United States (California Arizona New Mexico Texas Nevada Utah Colorado Wyoming South Dakota)
 Hymenothrix glandulopubescens  
 Hymenothrix greenmanii  - México State
 Hymenothrix janakosiana - Chihuahua
 Hymenothrix loomisii - Loomis's thimblehead - California Nevada Arizona 
 Hymenothrix palmeri -  Chihuahua
 Hymenothrix pedata - Chihuahua, Coahuila, United States (New Mexico Texas)
 Hymenothrix wislizeni - Trans-Pecos thimblehead  - Chihuahua, Sonora, Arizona New Mexico Texas 
 Hymenothrix wrightii - Wright's thimblehead - Chihuahua, Baja California, California, Arizona, New Mexico and Texas

 formerly included
Hymenothrix purpurea Brandegee - Florestina purpurea (Brandegee) Rydb.

References

External links
 Jepson Manual Treatment
 United States Department of Agriculture Plants Profile

Bahieae
Asteraceae genera
Flora of Mexico
Flora of the Western United States
Taxa named by Asa Gray